In mathematics, in the field of harmonic analysis, an oscillatory integral operator is an integral operator of the form

where the function S(x,y) is called the phase of the operator and the function a(x,y) is called the symbol of the operator.  λ is a parameter. One often considers S(x,y) to be real-valued and smooth, and a(x,y) smooth and compactly supported. Usually one is interested in the behavior of Tλ for large values of λ.

Oscillatory integral operators often appear in many fields of mathematics (analysis, partial differential equations, integral geometry, number theory) and in physics.  Properties of oscillatory integral operators have been studied by Elias Stein and his school.

Hörmander's theorem
The following bound on the L2 → L2 action of oscillatory integral operators (or L2 → L2 operator norm) was obtained by Lars Hörmander in his paper on Fourier integral operators:

Assume that x,y ∈ Rn, n ≥ 1. Let S(x,y) be real-valued and smooth, and let a(x,y) be smooth and compactly supported.

References

Microlocal analysis
Harmonic analysis
Singular integrals
Fourier analysis
Integral transforms
Inequalities